Postal orders are issued in Pakistan. Postal orders of Pakistan are issued in the denominations of Rs. 1.00, Rs. 2.00, Rs. 5.00, Rs. 10.00, Rs. 15.00, Rs. 20.00, Rs. 30.00 and Rs. 50.00.

It is known that post offices in what is now Pakistan did issue Indian postal orders prior to 14 August 1947.

References 

Currencies of Pakistan
Pakistan
Postal system of Pakistan